The Egg of the Phoenix is an adventure module published in 1982 for the Advanced Dungeons & Dragons fantasy role-playing game.

Plot summary
The Egg of the Phoenix is an adventure in which the player characters travel to the Negative Material Plane to obtain the Egg of the Phoenix.

Publication history
R-3 The Egg of the Phoenix was written by Frank Mentzer, with art by Bob Walters, and published by TSR/RPGA in 1982 as a 16-page booklet with an outer folder. The module was a limited edition, and was only available for purchase to RPGA members. It was later rewritten, and collected with the other modules from the R-series in I12 Egg of the Phoenix.

Reception

Reviews

References

Dungeons & Dragons modules
Role-playing game supplements introduced in 1982